Mahoning Township is the name of some places in the U.S. state of Pennsylvania:

 Mahoning Township, Armstrong County, Pennsylvania
 Mahoning Township, Carbon County, Pennsylvania
 Mahoning Township, Lawrence County, Pennsylvania
 Mahoning Township, Montour County, Pennsylvania

See also 
 East Mahoning Township, Indiana County, Pennsylvania
 North Mahoning Township, Indiana County, Pennsylvania
 South Mahoning Township, Indiana County, Pennsylvania
 West Mahoning Township, Indiana County, Pennsylvania
 Mahoning Township (disambiguation)

Pennsylvania township disambiguation pages